is a Japanese tokusatsu that aired from January 12 to March 30, 1999. It was the last production by Shotaro Ishinomori, released posthumously, who intended for the series to be serious, while it was originally written to be a parody of older tokusatsu programs. The acting cast consisted of Japanese voice actors and popular singers of music in Japanese animation.

Story
Years later, the now grown up children use the power of the Voistones to fight the Muon Empire and protect the Earth.

Characters

The Voiceluggers
 A fan of tokusatsu series of the 1970s, particularly Kamen Rider. She is the first to remember the events on Tsedua.
 She had been living in Los Angeles. She does not remember much about Tsedua, but her memory is slowly returning.
 A popular voice actor. He has memories of Tsedua and had been training his voice since his youth so it could be used as a weapon. He trains the other Voiceluggers to do the same.
 A self-proclaimed "idol voice actor" who becomes the most powerful of the four children. He is adept at playing musical instruments.
 The savior of the other four Voiceluggers who can transform his voice to suit his needs.

Allies
 An assassin sent by Genbah that Akiko turns into a friend with her voice.
 An android that also befriends the Voiceluggers.
 The former Voicelugger Gold.

Muon Empire
 The ruler of the Muon Empire who seeks to use the Voiceluggers to resurrect Hades.
 Once head of the Muon Empire forces.
 Female leader of the Muon Empire's forces.

Episodes
 (Original Airdate: January 12, 1999)
 (Original Airdate: January 19, 1999)
 (Original Airdate: January 26, 1999)
 (Original Airdate: February 2, 1999)
 (Original Airdate: February 9, 1999)
 (Original Airdate: February 16, 1999)
 (Original Airdate: February 23, 1999)
 (Original Airdate: March 2, 1999)
 (Original Airdate: March 9, 1999)
 (Original Airdate: March 16, 1999)
 (Original Airdate: March 23, 1999)
 (Original Airdate: March 30, 1999)

Cast
Voicelugger Ruby/Akiko Homura - 
Voicelugger Rose/Haruka Yuuki - 
Voicelugger Emerald/Tomokaze Daichi - 
Voicelugger Sapphire/Takeshi Tenma - 
Voicelugger Gold - 
General Gamma - 
Eyelash Line - 
Chaos - 
Mu (Voice) - 
Android Pi (Voice) - 
Emperor Genbah (Voice) -

Guest cast
 Captain Squad - Hiroshi Watari
 Squad Member - Keiya Asakura
 Squad Member - Keiichi Wada
 Squad Member - Ei Hamura
 Squad Member - Hiroshi Tsuchida
 Squad Member - Shu Kawai
 Squad Member - Daisuke Tsuchiya

Stunt Crew
Voicelugger Ruby - 
Voicelugger Rose - 
Voicelugger Emerald - 
Voicelugger Sapphire - 
Voicelugger Gold -

Songs
Opening theme  by Ichirou Mizuki
Released on a single with 
Ending theme  by Hironobu Kageyama with Apple Pie
Released on a single with

References
ボイスラッガー 今週のお話言いたい方だい１～最終回 
ボイスラッガーのあしあと  
Voicelugger

1999 Japanese television series debuts
1999 Japanese television series endings
Shotaro Ishinomori
Tokusatsu television series
TV Tokyo original programming